Novosibirsk State Technical University (Abbreviation: NSTU), until 1992 the Novosibirsk Electrotechnical Institute (NETI), is one of the major research and educational centers of Russia as well as one of the top technical universities located in Novosibirsk, Russia.

History
The university was established in accordance with the USSR Council of Ministries' Decree of 19 August 1950. It has 11 faculties and 2 institutes: Institute of Social Rehabilitation and Institute of Distant Education, 73 departments, 4 branches and 9 NSTU representative offices. At present, more than 14,000 students are receiving quality educations at NSTU. The teaching staff consists of 968 full-time and 216 part-time lecturers including 184 Professors, Doctors of Science, 762 Associate Professors and Candidates of Science.

The center of Information Technologies provides the university with a local network of more than 600 computers. The network has more than 5 km of connections with access to the internet. A project for accessing information from the scientific library is underway. Since 1996 a data base has been under development on the basis of Folio Infobase.

The university publishes the journal NSTU Bulletin, scientific works, textbooks, monographs, and teaching manuals. Candidates of Science and Doctors of Science are conferred by 11 specialist councils.

The university's library holds a book supply, consisting of the newest books in English, received by the university within the framework of the program TACIS - "Economic Education". The printing house of NSTU publishes scientific transactions and monographs and provides students with notebooks and school supplies.

The university has an academic choir, an ensemble of violinists widely known in Novosibirsk and a jazz orchestra, the laureate of big number of competitions and festivals, including the European Music Festival for Young People in Neerpelt.

International links
NSTU actively cooperates with foreign universities and has made 25 agreements for co-operation in scientific research, education and culture with universities of America, Germany, France, South Korea, China, etc. Also student mobility are promoted with other technical universities through the Salzburg Seminar, Britain Council, DAAD, INTAS, TEMPUS, EDRUS-TACIS, TACIS.

A regional center for international cooperation in the educational field of engineering has been working in NSTU since 1995. Authorized training centers of leading companies from the US and Germany, e.g. Sun Microsystems, Texas Instruments, Schneider, DEC, Autodesk, Motorola, AEG, and DMG have been opened. In 2009, NSTU was chosen as a university of the Shanghai Cooperation Organisation. It is a member of several academic co-operations and maintains close links to the industry. The university attracts teachers from others countries, especially for foreign language training (English, German, French, Korean, Japanese, Chinese and Turkish).

Organization
The university is made up of 73 departments, organized into 11 faculties:

Automation and Computer Science
Business
Humanities
Physical Engineering
Jurisprudence
Applied Mathematics and Computer Science
Electromechanical Engineering
Radio Engineering and Electronics
Aircraft Engineering
Power Engineering
Mechanics and Technology

Study structure
Training is conducted using a multilevel structure of education:

Baccalaureate (bakalavr) degree, delivering a broad understanding of fundamental Engineering Science and a thorough introduction to Economics, Management and Communication. Students are admitted through competitive examinations for students holding a Higher School Diploma or by virtue of outstanding academic records.
Specialist degree opens access to professional practice in areas like medicine, engineering and teaching, and it is also the traditional prerequisite for admission to doctoral studies. The qualification of  Specialist Diploma is awarded after studies lasting 5 to 6 years. The diploma is awarded in all fields of study, including various specializations. The State final attestation for a Specialist Diploma covers the defense of a project or a thesis and State final examinations. The procedure for the State final attestation and for the award of the Diploma as well as the content of Diploma supplement are the same as for the bachelor's degree. The Specialist Diploma gives access to a PhD program or employment.
Master's (magistr) degree is generally of two years duration and has a more pronounced research focus in comparison to the Specialist Diploma. Each faculty has its own specific admission requirements.
Candidate of Sciences (kandidat nauk) (as an equivalent to PhD) degree normally requires at least three years of study after the award of the Specialist Diploma or the Magistr degree and defending the dissertation.

Notable alumni
 Natalia Fileva (1963–2019) was a Russian businesswoman and chairman of the board of directors of S7 Airlines.
 Anatoly Lokot (born 1959), a member of the CPRF, a member of the State Duma, the mayor of Novosibirsk.
 Dmitry Revyakin (born 1964), rock musician, frontman for the Russian folk rock band Kalinov Most.
 Alexandr Sysoyev (born 1961), Russian businessman, founder of the 2GIS.
 Sergey Zayashnikov (born 1964), sports promoter, author.

See also 

 Violin Ensemble of Novosibirsk State Technical University

References

External links

Novosibirsk State Technical University's Russian website
Novosibirsk State Technical University's English website

1950 establishments in Russia
 
Educational institutions established in 1950
Engineering universities and colleges in Russia
Leninsky District, Novosibirsk
Public universities and colleges in Russia
Universities and institutes established in the Soviet Union
Universities in Novosibirsk Oblast
Buildings and structures in Novosibirsk